Harry Redmond may refer to:

 Harry Redmond (baseball) (1887–1960), baseball player
 Harry Redmond Jr. (1909–2011), American special effects artist and film producer
 Harry Redmond (footballer) (1933–1985), English footballer